These lists of rapid transit systems are sorted by the type of system:
 List of tram and light rail transit systems
 List of town tramway systems
 Medium-capacity rail transport system
 List of premetro systems
 List of metro systems
 List of automated urban metro subway systems
 List of monorail systems
 List of suburban and commuter rail systems
 List of funicular railways

See also
 List of bus rapid transit systems
 List of trolleybus systems
 List of airport people mover systems

Rapid transit
Transport lists